Petya of My Petya (Bulgarian: Петя на моята Петя) is a 2021 Bulgarian drama film directed by Alexander Kossev (in his directorial debut) and written by Valentina Angelova & Nelly Dimitrova. Starring Alexandra Kostova, Alena Vergova, Yasen Atanasov and Martin Metodiev. It is inspired by the life and work of the poet Petya Dubarova. The film was named on the shortlist for Bulgarian's entry for the Academy Award for Best International Feature Film at the 95th Academy Awards, but it was not selected. It was considered again when Mother was disqualified, however, it was not selected.

Synopsis 
Grieved by injustice at school, betrayed by her closest people, 17-year-old Petya commits suicide. This happened to the talented poetess Petya Dubarova in 1979. This also happened in 2019 to an ordinary girl, also named Petya. Different times, different girl, the System that does not tolerate the different remains the same.

Cast 
The actors participating in this film are:

 Albena Pavlova
 Vasil Banov
 Yasen Atanasov
 Martin Metodiev
 Yulian Vergov
 Aleksandra Kostova
 Alisa Atanasova as Petya Dubarova
 Alena Vergova

Release 
The film had its international premiere on March 20, 2021, at the Sofia International Film Festival. The film was commercially released on January 21, 2022, in Bulgarian theaters. The film was released on January 28, 2023, in some European territories on HBO Max.

Awards

References

External links 

 

2021 films
2021 drama films
Bulgarian drama films
2020s Bulgarian-language films
Films set in Bulgaria
Films shot in Bulgaria
2021 directorial debut films
Films about suicide